The 2010–11 PBA season was the 36th season of the Philippine Basketball Association. It started on October 3, 2010 and ended on August 21, 2011. The season marked the return of the original three-conference format, starting with the Philippine Cup, or the traditional All-Filipino Conference. The import-laden Commissioner's Cup returned as the second tournament, while the Governors' Cup also returned, serving as the third conference which also served as an import-laden tournament.

The first activity of the season is the 2010 PBA Draft held on August 29 at the Market! Market! in Taguig.

Pre-season events

Player movement

Key transactions:
Trades:
Air21 traded Doug Kramer to Rain or Shine for Marcy Arellano.
Meralco dealt Ali Peek to Air21 for Beau Belga. Peek was then traded to Talk 'N Text for J.R. Quiñahan.
Later on a separate transaction, Talk 'N Text traded Mark Cardona to Air21 in exchange of their 2010 first round pick. Air21 later traded Cardona to Meralco in exchange of Joshua Urbiztondo and Meralco's 2010 1st round pick.
B-Meg Derby Ace traded Paul Artadi to San Miguel in exchange of Jonas Villanueva. Air21, acting as a conduit team, will get B-Meg Derby Ace's 2014 1st draft pick in exchange of their 2013 2nd round pick.
Powerade traded Larry Rodriguez to Rain or Shine in exchange for Eddie Laure and Rain or Shine's 2011 1st round draft pick.
Meralco traded Jason Misolas and Khasim Mirza to Barako Bull for Rob Reyes. Reyes was then traded, along with Meralco's 2011 and 2012 2nd round picks to Powerade in exchange for Asi Taulava. Powerade's Ken Bono was also traded to Barako Bull for the team's 2013 2nd round draft pick.

Signing:
Rain or Shine signed John Ferriols and Paolo Bugia.
Talk 'N Text signed Rich Alvarez.

Rule changes
The PBA board approved the rule changes for implementation starting this season:

Notable occurrences
 Angelico "Chito" Salud became the eight commissioner of the league after the incumbent Sonny Barrios retired from his post.
 The PBA board approved the sale of the Sta. Lucia team franchise to Meralco. The team will now be known as the Meralco Bolts.
 The league will return to a three-conference format starting this season.
 Coca-Cola Philippines announced that they will rechristen the Coca-Cola Tigers as the Powerade Tigers.
 The Alaska Aces retired the jerseys of Johnny Abarrientos and Bong Hawkins in celebration of the 25th year of their franchise on September 28.

Opening ceremonies
The season began on October 3 with the Meralco Bolts defeating the Barangay Ginebra Kings, 73-72.

The muses for the participating teams are as follows:

2010–11 Philippine Cup

Transactions

Player movement

Key transactions:
Trades:
Barako Bull Energy Boosters trades Hans Thiele to the Meralco Bolts in exchange for Dennis Daa.
San Miguel Beermen trades Lordy Tugade and Chris Canta to the Barako Bull Energy Boosters in exchange for Sunday Salvacion.
Meralco Bolts trades Marlou Aquino, Khasim Mirza, Pong Escobal and a future draft pick to the Barako Bull Energy Boosters in exchange for Reed Juntilla and Mark Isip.

Notable events
Asi Taulava of Meralco, Solomon Mercado of Rain or Shine and Kelly Williams of Talk 'N Text will be loaned to Smart Gilas for the duration of the Asian Games in Guangzhou, China.
 PBA Commissioner Chito Salud proposed a "Developmental League" patterned after the NBA D-League after the merger of Liga Pilipinas and the Philippine Basketball League (PBL) fell out. The D-League proposal was eventually approved by the board of governors on January 25 and it is set to be launch on March.
The board of governors approve the request of the Barako Bull Energy Boosters for a leave of absence for this season's Commissioner's Cup. The Smart Gilas Philippine basketball team will temporarily take over its place. All of the players of the Barako Bull will be put in a dispersal draft and will return to their mother team after the conference ends.

Elimination round

Playoffs

Quarterfinals 

|}

|}
*Team has twice-to-beat advantage. Team #1 only has to win once, while Team #2 has to win twice.

Semifinals 

|}

Finals 

|}
Finals MVP: Jimmy Alapag and Jayson Castro (Talk 'N Text)
Best Player of the Conference: Jay Washington (San Miguel)

2011 Commissioner's Cup

Notable events
The conditional dispersal draft of the Barako Bull players was held in the PBA office in Libis, Quezon City on February 7. Out of the 14 players, only Lordy Tugade and Pong Escobal were drafted by San Miguel and B-Meg Derby Ace respectively.
The Board of Governors approved Solar Entertainment's proposal to change its broadcast television partner from RPN to ABS-CBN's Studio 23 for the remainder of its contract with the league, beginning with the 2011 Commissioner's Cup.
The PBA D-League will start on March 12 at the Filoil Flying V Arena in San Juan. The league will be composed of 14 teams, with three teams (Powerade-UP, Metro Pacific, Maynilad) having affiliation with existing PBA teams. Four teams (Cobra Energy Drink, Agri-Nature Inc./FCA, Pharex, and Cafe France) that supposed to be part of the revival of the dormant Philippine Basketball League filed for application in the PBA D-League, hours after the PBL held its press conference regarding its revival.
The sale of the Barako Bull Energy Boosters' franchise to Phoenix Petroleum did not push through after they failed to get the required number of votes (seven out of ten) from the PBA Board of Governors. Due to this development, Barako Bull's leave of absence was extended up to the end of the Governors' Cup.

Player movement

Key transactions:
Trades:
On January 20, Rain or Shine, Meralco and Air21 were involved in a three-way trade. Rain or Shine was able to get Ronjay Buenafe, Ronnie Matias, the 2011 and 2013 1st round picks from Air21 and Beau Belga from Meralco. Meralco will now have Solomon Mercado and Paolo Bugia from Rain or Shine and Erick Rodriguez of Air21. Air21 will now have Jay-R Reyes from Rain or Shine, Reed Juntilla from Meralco and the 2011 and 2013 second round picks from Meralco.
On January 28, Air21 traded J.R. Quiñahan to Powerade in exchange for the team's 2014 1st round pick. The said trade was revised by Commissioner Chito Salud on January 31 and Air21 will instead get Powerade's 2012 second round and 2013 first round picks.
Alaska traded Reynel Hugnatan to Meralco in exchange for Hans Thiele and Paolo Bugia.
On March 2, Commissioner Chito Salud approves the trade between Air21 and San Miguel. Air21 traded top rookie picks Nonoy Baclao, Rabeh Al-Hussaini, and Rey Guevarra in exchange for Danny Seigle, Dondon Hontiveros, Dorian Peña and Paul Artadi. The proposed trade was disapproved by Commissioner Salud when San Miguel initially offered Danny Seigle, Mick Pennisi, Joseph Yeo and a 2011 first round pick in exchange for the three Air21 rookies.

Signing:
Meralco signs Marlou Aquino and will assume his Barako Bull contract until the end of the Commissioner's Cup.
Smart Gilas has listed Borgie Hermida in their line-up for the Commissioner's Cup and will return to Barako Bull after the tournament. However, Barako Bull announced that they will not play for the remainder of the season. Eventually, Hermida was released from Gilas.
San Miguel Beermen has added Paolo Hubalde to their roster for the Commissioner's Cup and will return to Barako Bull after the tournament. However, Barako Bull announced that they will not play for the remainder of the season.

Coaching changes
On January 10, the Rain or Shine Elasto Painters hired Air21 Express coach Yeng Guiao as head coach, after Guiao's contract with Air21 expired on December 31, 2010. Guiao will be replacing Caloy Garcia, who will slide down as assistant coach.
On January 19, the Air21 Express hired Bong Ramos as head coach, replacing head Yeng Guiao whose contract expired on December 31, 2010.

Elimination round

Playoffs

Quarterfinals 

|}

Semifinals 

|}

Finals 

|}
Finals MVP: Jimmy Alapag and Jayson Castro (Talk 'N Text)
Best Player of the Conference: Jimmy Alapag (Talk 'N Text)
Best Import of the Conference: Nate Brumfield (Barangay Ginebra)

2011 PBA All-Star Weekend

The 2011 PBA All-Star Weekend were held from May 20 to 22 at the Boracay Convention Center, Malay, Aklan. The winners were:

Obstacle Challenge: Jonas Villanueva (B-Meg Derby Ace Llamados)
Three-point Shootout: Mark Macapagal (Powerade Tigers)
Slam Dunk Competition: Kelly Williams (Talk 'N Text Tropang Texters)
Legends Shootout: Active players - Mark Macapagal (Powerade), Ronald Tubid (Barangay Ginebra) and Jimmy Alapag (Talk 'N Text)

Rookie-Sophomore Blitz Game

 Blitz Game MVP: Robert Labagala and Sean Anthony (Rookies)

All-Star Game

 All-Star Game MVP: Marc Pingris (North All-Stars)

2011 Governors' Cup

Player movement

Key transactions:
Trades:
On May 18, Air21 traded Wesley Gonzales to Alaska for Elmer Espiritu.
Alaska traded Joe Devance to Air21 for Jay-R Reyes. On May 30, Commissioner Chito Salud revised the trade and added Air21's 2011 and 2012 2nd round picks. On June 3, Devance then traded to B-Meg Derby Ace Llamados for KG Canaleta and Jondan Salvador.
On July 18, Barangay Ginebra traded Willie Miller to Air21 Express for KG Canaleta and a 2012 first round draft pick (acquired from the Powerade Tigers in a trade involving Sean Anthony and Renren Ritualo on September 13, 2010)

Notable occurrences
 San Miguel Corporation announced that they will rename the San Miguel Beermen as the Petron Blaze Boosters.
B-Meg Derby Ace Llamados shorten their name into B-Meg Llamados.
 Two elimination round games were held at the Al Shabab Al Arabi Sports Club in Dubai, United Arab Emirates from June 30 to July 1 featuring B-Meg, Talk 'N Text and Barangay Ginebra. B-Meg won against Talk 'N Text, 111-105, then Talk 'N Text beat Barangay Ginebra the next day, 123-113.
 Players of the Talk 'N Text Tropang Texters got stranded in Dubai after their two-game stint. The travel agency in charge reportedly cancelled their plane tickets to Manila after the non-payment of the organizers.
 PBA announced that TV5 will become the provide their TV coverage for the next five years. This was made by Commissioner Chito Salud on July 8, 2011 during the PBA Board of Governors meeting. TV5 guaranteed the league P700 million in cash, P150 million for marketing and promotions, and P115 million worth of ad spots up to 2016. TV5 will also be handling the radio coverage of the PBA as well.
 Barako Bull has sold their franchise to Linaheim Corp. following approval of the sale by the PBA Board of Governors on July 8, 2011, thus making the PBA to have 10 teams next season.

Elimination round

Semifinal round

Finals

|}
Finals MVP: Arwind Santos (Petron Blaze)
Best Player of the Conference: Arwind Santos (Petron Blaze)
Best Import of the Conference: Arizona Reid (Rain or Shine)

Smart Ultimate All-Star Weekend

The Smart Ultimate All-Star Weekend was held from July 23–24 at the newly renamed Smart Araneta Coliseum in Quezon City. The all star weekend featured the Smart All-Stars, with Kobe Bryant as its playing coach challenging the PBA All-Stars, with Chot Reyes as the head coach and the Smart Gilas Philippine national basketball team. The event was organized by Smart Communications and the MVP Sports Foundation, headed by Manuel V. Pangilinan, team owner of the Talk 'N Text Tropang Texters and the Meralco Bolts in the PBA.

Rosters
Note: Due to the ongoing NBA lockout, the Smart All-Stars cannot affiliate themselves with the NBA or their teams. The list below indicates the NBA teams where the player is associated before the lockout began.

Smart All-Stars:
Kevin Durant (Oklahoma City Thunder)
Tyreke Evans (Sacramento Kings)
Derek Fisher (Los Angeles Lakers)
James Harden (Oklahoma City Thunder)
JaVale McGee (Washington Wizards)
Chris Paul (New Orleans Hornets)
Derrick Rose (Chicago Bulls)
Derrick Williams (Minnesota Timberwolves)
Playing Coach: Kobe Bryant (Los Angeles Lakers)

PBA All-Stars:
Rabeh Al-Hussaini (Petron Blaze Boosters)
Alex Cabagnot (Petron Blaze Boosters)
Mark Caguioa (Barangay Ginebra Kings)
Jayson Castro (Talk 'N Text Tropang Texters)
Gary David (Powerade Tigers)
Larry Fonacier (Talk 'N Text Tropang Texters)
JC Intal (Barangay Ginebra Kings)
Sol Mercado (Meralco Bolts)
Gabe Norwood (Rain or Shine Elasto Painters)
Marc Pingris (B-Meg Llamados)
Ryan Reyes (Talk 'N Text Tropang Texters)
Arwind Santos (Petron Blaze Boosters)
Danny Seigle (Air21 Express)
LA Tenorio (Alaska Aces)
Sonny Thoss (Alaska Aces)
James Yap (B-Meg Llamados)
Coach: Chot Reyes (Talk 'N Text Tropang Texters)

Results

Individual awards

Most Valuable Player race
This how the MVP award was determined:

List
Most Valuable Player: Jimmy Alapag (Talk 'N Text)
Rookie of the Year: Rabeh Al-Hussaini (Petron Blaze)
First Mythical Team:
Jimmy Alapag (Talk 'N Text)
Mark Caguioa (Barangay Ginebra)
Arwind Santos (Petron Blaze)
Sonny Thoss (Alaska)
Kelly Williams (Talk 'N Text)
Second Mythical Team:
Jayson Castro (Talk 'N Text)
Joe Devance (B-Meg)
Ali Peek (Talk 'N Text)
Jay Washington (Petron Blaze)
James Yap (B-Meg)
All-Defensive Team:
John Wilson (Barangay Ginebra)
Willy Wilson (Barangay Ginebra)
Arwind Santos (Petron Blaze)
Marc Pingris (B-Meg)
Ryan Reyes (Talk 'N Text)
Most Improved Player: Jayson Castro (Talk 'N Text)
Sportsmanship Award: Sonny Thoss (Alaska)

Awards given by the PBA Press Corps
 Coach of the Year: Chot Reyes (Talk 'N Text)
 Mr. Quality Minutes: Jayson Castro (Talk 'N Text)
 Comeback Player of the Year: Danny Ildefonso (Petron Blaze)
 Executive of the Year: Manny Pangilinan (Talk 'N Text)
 Referee of the Year: Jimmy Mariano
 Player of the Week Order of Merit: Mark Caguioa (Barangay Ginebra)
 Defensive Player of the Year: Arwind Santos (Petron Blaze)
All-Rookie Team
Rabeh Al-Hussaini (Petron Blaze)
Nonoy Baclao (Petron Blaze)
John Wilson (Barangay Ginebra)
Robert Labagala (Barangay Ginebra)
Sean Anthony (Powerade)

Cumulative standings

Elimination rounds

Playoffs

Notes

References

External links
PBA.ph

 
PBA